A sponsored search auction (SSA), also known as a keyword auction, is an indispensable part of the business model of modern web hosts. It refers to results from a search engine that are not output by the main search algorithm, but
rather clearly separate advertisements paid for by third parties. These advertisements
are typically related to the terms for which the user searched. They come in the form
of a link and some information, with the hope that a search user will click on the link
and buy something from the advertiser.
In sponsored search auctions, there are typically some fixed number of slots for advertisements and more advertisers that want these slots than there are slots. The advertisers
have different valuations for these slots and slots are a scarce resource, so an auction
is done to determine how the slots will be assigned.

History
Prior to 1998, many advertisements were charged by impression, as it was the
easiest metric to calculate. In 1998, GoTo.com, Inc debuted a pay-per-click charging
system, with pricing and slot placement determined by an auction. GoTo used a first
price auction, where bidders were placed according to their bids and charged their bids
when they won. GoTo faced bidders who were constantly changing their bid
in response to new information and changing information from other bidders.

Currently, charging per action is a common pricing scheme in affiliate networks,
such as the Amazon Associates Program.

In 2002, Google Ads began using a second price auction to sell the single advertisement
slot. Shortly thereafter, pages had multiple advertisements slots, which were allocated
and sold via generalized second-price auction (GSP) auction, the natural generalization of a second price, single item, multi bidder
auction.

Marketing activities related to the sponsored search are increasingly contracted out to specialized digital marketing agencies (DMAs). Thousands of DMAs operate in the US market, but most of them belong to one of the seven agency networks, which also bid on behalf of their clients for keywords for sponsored search. This phenomenon has increased the fraction of auctions in which the same agency bids on behalf of different advertisers, thereby altering the normal functioning of standard sponsored search auction mechanisms, such as the generalized second-price auction and the Vickrey–Clarke–Groves auction.

Auction Mechanisms

Generalized Second Price Auction
Generalized second-price auction (GSP) is the most commonly used auction mechanism for sponsored search.

Untruthfulness
An issue with GSP is that it's not a truthful auction and it is not the optimal strategy. To illustrate this, consider the following example.

There are three bidders with only two possible slots. The values of
each bidders 1, 2, and 3 are $10, $5, and $3 respectively. Suppose that the first slot click
through rate (CTR) is 300 and the second slot CTR is 290. If bidder 1 is truthful, he
However, if bidder 1 decides to lie and reports a value of $4 instead then his utility
would be . Notice that  which makes GSP
untruthful and bidders have an incentive to lie.

Quality Variant
Google uses a minor variant of GSP to auction off advertisement slots. Potential
advertisements may be of varying quality. Suppose that there are two advertisements
for eggs. One advertisement simply fills its space with the word “egg” repeated over
and over, while the other advertisement shows a picture of eggs, contains branding
information, and mentions positive qualities about their eggs, such as cage-freeness.
The second advertisement may be thought of as having higher quality than the first
advertisement, being more useful to consumers, more likely to be clicked on, and more
likely to generate revenue for both the advertiser and Google. Advertisements that
have a history of high click through rates, are geographically targeted at the user, or
have a high quality landing page may also be thought of as having higher quality.

Google assigns a numeric “quality” score  to each bidder . Bidders, rather than
being ordered purely by their bid, are instead ordered by rank, which is the product
of their bid and quality score  . Slots are still assigned in
decreasing rank order. Bidders are charged (rather than the bid of the bidder one rank
lower) the minimum price for which, if it was their bid,
would keep them in their current rank: .

Vickrey–Clarke–Groves Auction
Vickrey–Clarke–Groves auction (VCG) is a truthful auction optimizing social welfare. VCG is more complicated to explain than GSP and that might deter many websites from using a VCG auction mechanism even though it's truthful. However, some websites use VCG as their auction mechanism, most notably Facebook.

See also
Generalized second-price auction
Vickrey–Clarke–Groves auction

References

Internet search
Contexts_for_auctions